American Racing Equipment Inc. is a manufacturer of wheels sold via the aftermarket retail sector. Production started during the muscle car era in the United States. Platinum Equity investment group acquired American Racing Equipment Inc in June 2005.

History
Romeo Palamides, an early drag racing innovator and grandfather of jet car racing, designed and crafted leading edge, high strength-to-weight magnesium drag racing wheels for a competition dragster constructed in the early 1950s. The vehicle debuted on the cover of the November 1956 issue of Hot Rod Magazine. The car gained attention and, in the early years of hot rodding, generated street-enthusiast interest in lightweight, high-tech wheels designed for the car. Romeo's vision, working from Jim Ellison's small machine shop in San Francisco, along with engineer Tom Griffith, evolved into the aftermarket wheel company. In 1956, they formed American Racing Equipment.

Products

Torq Thrust
American Racing produced the Torq Thrust wheel that was first applied on the dragstrip and became a popular street racing wheel. It was specifically designed with a "tapered parabolic contour" spoke, as opposed to a semi-solid modular design, to increase brake cooling and simultaneously decrease wheel mass.

The Torq Thrust wheel is considered by some as the most famous muscle car wheel of all time and is sometimes credited as starting the entire custom wheel movement.

Baja
The Baja was one of American Racing's first aluminum truck wheels. It is a one-piece, 8-hole design with a polished finish. This wheel is still used with trucks, Jeeps, and other off-road type vehicles and is available in various sizes, offsets, and lug patterns.

Libre 
The Libre, sometimes known as the "daisy" wheel, was a 4-lug, 4-spoke wheel popular with sports car racers, often seen on MGB's and Datsun 510's. Each spoke appeared to bulge slightly in the middle, giving the wheel a robust appearance. These were cast in magnesium for racing and in aluminum alloy for street use. Eventually, the Libre molds were sold to Shelby American, who marketed the Libre under their name. Some 13" Libres have raised lettering on one spoke reading "SCCA", indicating wheels that were specially made for SCCA's Spec Racer program.

200 S 
The 200 S used the "daisy" spoke of the Libre in a 5-lug, 5-spoke design. The 200 S was popular with Corvette owners and street rod builders. It was one of the first wheels to go over 200  mph safely, thus came about the 200S name.

LeMans
The LeMans was another 4 spoke, 4 lug design, cast in sizes and fitments for sports cars such as Alfa Romeo, MGB and Datsun 240Z. Each tapered spoke was wider at the hub than at the rim, giving a lightweight appearance similar to Ferrari wheels of the period. BRE 240Zs used these wheels in the SCCA competition, and street-driven 240Zs followed suit.

Silverstone
This was AR's take on the 4-lug, 8-spoke British Minilite wheel for sports cars, with one side of each spoke relieved near the hub for lug nut clearance, and the other side of each spoke continuing to the hub circle. These were cast in magnesium for racing and in aluminum-alloy for street use.

Vector
The Vector is a 5-lug, 10-spoke, one-piece aluminum wheel used on the '69 Dodge Charger called the General Lee, from the television show The Dukes of Hazzard.

References

 Wheel manufacturers
 Auto parts suppliers of the United States